Lac des Arcs can refer to:

 Lac des Arcs, Alberta, a hamlet in Alberta, Canada
 Lac des Arcs (Alberta), a lake in Alberta, Canada